The River Dove is the principal river of the southwestern Peak District, in the Midlands of England and is around  in length. It rises on Axe Edge Moor near Buxton and flows generally south to its confluence with the River Trent at Newton Solney. From there, its waters reach the North Sea via the Humber Estuary. For almost its entire course it forms the boundary between the counties of Staffordshire (to the west) and Derbyshire (to the east). The river meanders past Longnor and Hartington and cuts through a set of deep limestone gorges, Beresford Dale, Wolfscote Dale, Milldale and Dovedale.

The river is a famous trout stream. Charles Cotton's Fishing House, which was the inspiration for Izaak Walton's The Compleat Angler, stands in the woods by the river near Hartington.

The river's name is now usually pronounced to rhyme with "love", but its original pronunciation rhymed with "rove". This pronunciation is still used by some residents of the lower reaches of the river.

Dovedale

From Hartington to its confluence with the River Manifold at Ilam, the river flows through a series of scenic limestone valleys, known collectively as Dovedale. Dovedale is also particularly used for the name of that section between the stepping stones under Thorpe Cloud and Milldale. The Dovedale gorge is considered so scenic that it attracts a million visitors a year. Good riverside paths make the whole route accessible to walkers.

Much of the dale is in the ownership of the National Trust, being part of their  South Peak Estate. Dovedale itself was acquired in 1934, with successive properties being added until 1938, and Wolfscote Dale in 1948. Dovedale was declared a national nature reserve in 2006.

Dovedale's attractions include rock pillars such as Ilam Rock, Viator's Bridge, and the limestone features Lovers' Leap and Reynard's Cave.

Lower Dove
Once the river leaves Dovedale it combines with the Manifold and enters a wider valley near Thorpe. The valley increases in size as the river continues south to reach Mapleton and then Mayfield, where it is crossed by the medieval Hanging Bridge. At this point it is joined by the Bentley Brook, and then nearby at Church Mayfield, by the Henmore Brook.

The Dove now flows in a south-westerly direction, passing Norbury and Ellastone, where it turns south until it reaches Rocester. To the south of the village, at Combridge it is joined by its largest tributary the River Churnet. As it reaches the ancient Dove Bridge, it is joined by the River Tean, the river now meandering through a wide valley which turns east as it passes between Doveridge and Uttoxeter; the only town along its length.

Beyond this point riverside communities, such as Marchington, Sudbury and Scropton, tend to be located at the edge of the valley; although the village of Hatton encroaches across the valley floor, where it is linked by a bridge to Tutbury whose Castle overlooks the crossing.  The river continues east passing the villages of Marston, Rolleston and Egginton, where it is joined by its last tributary, the Hilton Brook. The river is divided at this point, with some flow passing through the mill fleam at Clay Mills, the two arms rejoin downstream of the A38 road bridge and Monks Bridge, and then to the south, the Dove reaches its confluence with the River Trent, at Newton Solney.

Tributaries

Alphabetical list of tributaries, extracted from the Water Framework Directive list of water bodies for the River Dove:

Alders Brook which joins the Dove near Rocester
Bentley Brook
River Churnet
Foston Brook which joins the Dove near Rocester
Henmore Brook 
Hilton Brook 
River Manifold
Marchington Brook which joins the Dove near Marchington
Marston Brook which joins the Dove near Marchington
Picknall Brook which joins the Dove near Uttoxeter
Rolleston Brook which joins the Dove near Rolleston on Dove
River Tean
Tit Brook which joins the Dove near Ellastone

See also

Rivers of the United Kingdom
List of rivers of England

References

 
Rivers of Derbyshire
Rivers of Staffordshire
Rivers and valleys of the Peak District
 
Tributaries of the River Trent